SS Klondike is the name of two sternwheelers, the second now a National Historic Site located in Whitehorse, Yukon. They ran freight between Whitehorse and Dawson City, along the Yukon River, the first from 1929 to 1936 and the second, an almost exact replica of the first, from 1937 to 1950.

Klondike I was built by the British Yukon Navigation Company (a subsidiary of the White Pass and Yukon Route railway company) in 1929 and had the distinction of having 50% more capacity than a regular sternwheeler, while still having the shallow draft and meeting the size requirements in order to travel down the Yukon River. Klondike I had a cargo capacity of 270 metric tonnes without having to push a barge.

In June 1936, Klondike I ran aground north of The Thirty Mile section of the Yukon River (at ). The company salvaged the ship's boiler, engines, and many fittings to build Klondike II the following year. The remains of the hull of the Klondike I can still be seen at low water by canoeists on the Yukon River.

Klondike II carried freight until the early 1950s. Due to the construction of a highway connecting Dawson City and Whitehorse, many Yukon River sternwheelers were decommissioned. In an attempt to save Klondike II, she was converted into a cruise ship by White Pass and Yukon Route.  The Duke of Edinburgh (consort of Elizabeth II, Queen of Canada) was invited to tour the ship in 1954, being taken on a short trip down the Yukon River and back to Whitehorse during his day-long visit to the city. The venture shut down in 1955 due to lack of interest and Klondike II was left on the ways in the Whitehorse shipyards.

The ship was donated to Parks Canada and was gradually restored until 1966, when city authorities agreed to move the ship to its present location, at that time part of a squatters' area.  The task required three bulldozers, eight tons of Palmolive soap, a crew of twelve men, and three weeks to complete.  Greased log rollers eased the process. On 24 June 1967, the SS Klondike was designated a National Historic Site of Canada, and she is now open during the summer as a tourist attraction.

See also
SS Keno
SS Nenana
Steamboats of the Yukon River

References

Sources

External links 

 S.S. Klondike National Historic Site of Canada
 SS Klondike

Steamboats of the Yukon River
Merchant ships of Canada
SS Klondike
Museum ships in Yukon
1921 ships
1937 ships
Whitehorse